Mavis is a female given name, derived from a name for the common Old World song thrush. Its first modern usage was in Marie Corelli's 1895 novel The Sorrows of Satan, which featured a character named Mavis Clare (whose name was said to be "rather odd but suitable", as "she sings quite as sweetly as any thrush"<ref>Marie Corelli 'The Sorrows of Satan 2006 Adamant Media Corporation p. 127</ref>). The name was long obsolete by the 19th century, but known from its poetic use, as in Robert Burns's 1794 poem Ca' the Yowes ("Hark the mavis evening sang/Sounding Clouden's woods amang"); and in the popular love song "Mary of Argyle" (c.1850), where lyricist Charles Jefferys wrote, "I have heard the mavis singing its love-song to the morn."Mavis had its height of popularity between the 1920s and 1940s. Its usage declined thereafter, and it has been rather unfashionable since the 1960s.

 Notable people 
 Mavis Adjei, Ghanaian actress
 Mavis Akoto, Ghanaian sprinter
 Mavis Batey, MBE (1921-2013), English code-breaker during World War II
 Mavis Biesanz (1919–2008), Finnish-American writer and sociologist
 Mavis B. Carroll (1917–2009), American statistician
 Mavis Cheek (b. 1948), English novelist and feminist
 Mavis Chirandu (b. 1995), Zimbabwean footballer
 Mavis Thorpe Clark, AM (1909-1999), Australian novelist and children's writer
 Mavis Danso (b. 1984), Ghanaian footballer
 Mavis Doering (1929–2007), Cherokee Nation basketmaker from Oklahoma
 Mavis Dgajmah (b. 1973), Ghanaian footballer
 Mavis Ehlert (1922–2007), British-Canadian sculptor
 Mavis Fan (b. 1977), Taiwanese singer
 Mavis Freeman (1918–1988), American swimmer who competed in the 1936 Summer Olympics
 Mavis Gallant (1922–2014), Canadian writer
 Mavis Gibson, Zimbabwean lawyer, first black woman judge of the High Court of Zimbabwe, and first woman judge of the High Court of Namibia
 Mavis Gray née Beckett (b. 1944), Australian field hockey player
 Mavis Doriel Hay (1894–1979), British author
 Mavis Hee (b. 1974), Singaporean singer
 Mavis Hinds (1929–2009), English meteorologist
 Mavis Hutchinson, first woman to run across the United States
 Mavis Jones (1922–1990), Australian cricket player
 Mavis Jukes (b. 1947), American children's author
 Mavis Kelsey (1912–2013), American internist and one of the founders of the Kelsey-Seybold Clinic
 Mavis Hawa Koomson (b. 1966), Ghanaian politician and educationist
 Mavis Le Marquand, Jersey lawn bowler
 Mavis Leno (b. 1946), American feminist and wife of Jay Leno
 Mavis Maclean, MBE, FRSA (b. 1943), socio-legal researcher at the University of Oxford and founder of the Oxford Centre for Family Law and Policy (OXFLAP)
 Mavis Meadowcroft (1926–2008), Australian lawn bowler
 Mavis Moyo (b. 1929), Radio Zimbabwe broadcaster and founding member of the Federation of African Media Women Zimbabwe (FAMWZ)
 Mavis Mullins, New Zealand businesswoman
 Mavis Nicholson (b. 1930), Welsh broadcaster
 Mavis Ogun (b. 1973), Nigerian footballer who played in three FIFA Women's World Cups
 Mavis Pugh (1914–2006), English actress and comedian
 Mavis Rivers (1929–1992), Samoan and New Zealand jazz singer
 Mavis Smitheman, local body councillor for Ardwick, Manchester
 Mavis Staines (b. 1954), Canadian ballet dancer
 Mavis Staples (b. 1939), American rhythm and blues singer
 Mavis Steele MBE (1928–1998), British lawn bowler
 Mavis Sweeney (1909–1986), Australian hospital pharmacist who was awarded The Evans Medal for Merit in 1968
 Mavis Taillieu (b. 1952), Canadian politician
 Mavis Tate (1893–1947), British Conservative Party politician and feminist, born Maybird Hogg
 Mavis Taylor (1915–2007), Australian humanitarian
 Mavis Tchibota (b. 1996), Congolese footballer
 Mavis Villiers (1911–1976), British actress
 Mavis Wilson (fl. 1980–90s), Canadian politician

 Fictional characters 

 Mavis Anderson, secondary character and best friend to Miss Ellie Ewing (Barbara Bel Geddes) in Dallas Mavis Beacon, the eponymous African-American typing instructor of the Mavis Beacon Teaches Typing software
 Mavis Bramston, from The Mavis Bramston Show (1964–1968), an Australian television satire
 Mavis Buckey, an anthropomorphic animal character from the Funny Farm series
 Mavis Clare, a popular author who resists the temptation of the Devil in The Sorrows of Satan by Marie Corelli
 Mavis Cruet, an obese young fairy incapable of flight, from the British children's animated series Willo the Wisp Mavis Davis, a pseudonymous singer in the British comedy Bring Me the Head of Mavis Davis Mavis DeVere, one version of the actual name of Bubbles DeVere, a character in the BBC comedy series Little Britain Mavis Dracula, a 118-year-old vampire and the daughter of Count Dracula in the Hotel Transylvania movie franchise
 Mavis Freestone, a singer in the ...in Death series of detective novels
 Mavis Gary, the main character of Young Adult Mavis Madling, in the situation comedy series Designing Women Mavis McCready, a recurring character in the television series Greenleaf, portrayed by Oprah Winfrey
 Mavis Ming, title character of Michael Moorcock's The Transformation of Miss Mavis Ming, part of his Dancers at the End of Time series
 Mavis Munro, office manager in the comic book series Supernatural Law and Supernatural Law Secretary Mavis Mavis, a minor character in The Addy Book Series from American Girl Mavis, a thirteen year old girl with the powers of the birds of the world in the children's book series Mavis A Genuine Heroine
 Mavis Pike, in the British situation comedy Dad's Army Mavis Rae, main character in the situation comedy Whoopi Mavis Vermillion, founder and first master of the same-named guild in manga and anime Fairy Tail Mavis Wilton, in the British soap opera Coronation Street Dark Mavis, recurring character in English rock band Mansun's debut album Attack of the Grey Lantern Mavis (DC Comics), two fictional characters who first appeared in the DC Comics universe
 Mavis, from the BBC comedy Open All Hours Mavis, a diesel locomotive character from The Railway Series books by the Rev. W. Awdry and from the derived children's television series Thomas & Friends''

References 

Given names derived from birds